Chuanwan is a town of Liling City in Hunan Province, China. The town was rebuilt by merging the historic Chuanwan Town and the historic Qingshuijiang Township on November 26, 2015. As of 2015, it had a population of 53,400 and an area of 120.57 square kilometers.

Administrative divisions 
The town is divided into 8 villages and two districts: Sifang District, Jinziping District, Yutang Village, Xingqiao Village, Shili Village, Lejia Village, Taiqian Village, Chuanwan Village, Dajie Village, and Lishan Village.

References

External links

Divisions of Liling